Tuora-Kyuyol (Tuora Küöl) is a rural locality (a selo), the only inhabited locality, and the administrative center of Zhuleysky Rural Okrug of Tattinsky District in the Sakha Republic, Russia, located  from Ytyk-Kyuyol, the administrative center of the district. Its population as of the 2010 Census was 597, of whom 298 were male and 299 female, down from 620 as recorded during the 2002 Census.

References

Notes

Sources
Official website of the Sakha Republic. Registry of the Administrative-Territorial Divisions of the Sakha Republic. Tattinsky District. 

Rural localities in Tattinsky District